Palats Ukraina is a station on Kyiv Metro's Obolonsko–Teremkivska Line. The station was opened on 30 December 1984, and is named after Ukraine's biggest concert hall located near it. The architecture was designed by A.S. Krushynskyi, T.A. Tselikovska, N. Alyoskin, with other design by S. Kirichenko and R. Kirichenko.

Before 1991, the station was known as Chervonoarmiyska ("Red Army") after the former name of the Velyka Vasylkivska street above it. All Soviet decorations in the station (thus including the ones pictured below) were removed due to 2015 decommunization laws.

References

External links
 Kyivsky Metropoliten — Station description and photographs 
 Metropoliten.kiev.ua — Station description and photographs 

Kyiv Metro stations
Railway stations opened in 1984
1984 establishments in Ukraine